Agromyces allii is a Gram-positive and non-motile bacterium from the genus of Agromyces which has been isolated from the rhizosphere of the plant Allium victorialis var. platyphyllum from the Ulleung Island in Korea.

References 

Microbacteriaceae
Bacteria described in 2007